Hesychia or Hesykhia may refer to:

 Hesychia, the word from which Hesychasm, a tradition of prayer in Eastern Orthodox Christianity, is derived
 In Greek mythology, either the daemon personification of silence, a handmaiden of the god of sleep, Hypnos; or Hesychia (mythology), a mortal daughter of Thespius
 Synonym for Zygaena, genus of moths